Martha Sandoval Gustafson (born January 8, 1950) is a Mexican-Canadian Paralympic medallist in table tennis, swimming, and athletics. As a Mexican Paralympian, Gustafson won a total of twelve medals, which includes three golds at the 1976 Summer Paralympics and two golds and the 1980 Summer Paralympics. After she moved to Canada in 1981, Gustafson won six golds and one silver at the 1984 Summer Paralympics for Canada. In 2020, Gustafson became part of the Canadian Disability Hall of Fame.

Early life and education
Gustafson was born in Tampico, Mexico on January 8, 1950. When she was a child, she became sick with polio and required the use of wheelchair. Gustafson played various sports throughout her childhood including curling and shot put. In 1981, she moved from Mexico to Toronto, Canada.

Career
Gustafson played in various sports throughout her career including swimming, table tennis and athletics for both Mexico and Canada. For Mexico, Martha Sandoval competed at the 1976 Summer Paralympics and 1980 Summer Paralympics, winning a combined total of six gold and six silver. Alternatively, Martha Gustafson represented Canada at the 1984 Summer Paralympics, where she won six golds and one silver. For the 1988 Summer Paralympics, Gustafson won no medals in her three athletic events for Canada. Overall, she won one Paralympic medal in table tennis, six in athletics, and twelve in swimming.

Apart from the Paralympics, Gustafson won bronze in shot put at the 2011 IPC Athletics World Championships with a Championship Record of 3.45 metres. She also competed in the discus at that event and placed fourth. That same year, she won gold in shot put at the 2011 Canadian Track and Field Championships. A few years later, Gustafson came in 8th place in discus and 5th place in shot put at the 2013 IPC Athletics World Championships.

In 2016, Gustafson won silver at the 2016 Canadian Track and Field Championships in discus. For her 2019 events, Gustafson was seventh at the discus event during the 2019 World Para Athletics Championships. In the 2019 Parapan American Games, Gustafson won bronze in the discus.

Honors and personal life
Gustafson was a nominee for the Female Athlete With a Disability of the Year award at the 2010 and 2011 Ontario Sports Awards. In 2015, Martha Sandoval Gustafson was nominated for the Female Field Para Athlete award for Athletics Ontario. In 2020, Gustafson was inducted into the Canadian Disability Hall of Fame. That year, she was named the 2021 Bob Secord Award recipient from ParaSport Ontario. Gustafson was married and had one child.

References

External links
 
 

1950 births
Living people
Paralympic gold medalists for Mexico
Paralympic gold medalists for Canada
Paralympic silver medalists for Mexico
Paralympic silver medalists for Canada
Athletes (track and field) at the 1976 Summer Paralympics
Athletes (track and field) at the 1980 Summer Paralympics
Athletes (track and field) at the 1984 Summer Paralympics
Athletes (track and field) at the 1988 Summer Paralympics
Swimmers at the 1976 Summer Paralympics
Swimmers at the 1980 Summer Paralympics
Swimmers at the 1984 Summer Paralympics
Table tennis players at the 1976 Summer Paralympics
Table tennis players at the 1980 Summer Paralympics
Medalists at the 1976 Summer Paralympics
Medalists at the 1980 Summer Paralympics
Medalists at the 1984 Summer Paralympics
Paralympic medalists in athletics (track and field)
Paralympic track and field athletes of Canada
Paralympic athletes of Mexico
Paralympic swimmers of Canada
Paralympic swimmers of Mexico
Paralympic table tennis players of Mexico
Paralympic medalists in swimming
Paralympic medalists in table tennis
Mexican female discus throwers
Mexican female shot putters
Canadian female discus throwers
Canadian female shot putters
Sportspeople from Tampico, Tamaulipas
Canadian Disability Hall of Fame